Chunar is a constituency of the Uttar Pradesh Legislative Assembly covering the city of Chunar in the Mirzapur district of Uttar Pradesh, India.

Chunar is one of five assembly constituencies in the Mirzapur Lok Sabha constituency. Since 2008, this assembly constituency is numbered 398 amongst 403 constituencies. Current MLA from Chunar is Anurag Singh.

Election results

2022

2017
Bharatiya Janta Party candidate Anurag Singh won in 2017 Uttar Pradesh Legislative Elections defeating Samajwadi Party candidate Jagtamba Singh Patel by a margin of 62,228 votes.

References

External links
 

Assembly constituencies of Uttar Pradesh
Mirzapur district